René Barrientos Ortuño (30 May 1919 – 27 April 1969) was a Bolivian military officer and politician who served as the 47th president of Bolivia twice nonconsecutively from 1964 to 1966 and from 1966 to 1969. During much of his first term, he shared power as co-president with Alfredo Ovando from 1965 to 1966 and prior to that served as the 30th vice president of Bolivia in 1964. 

General Barrientos came to power after the 1964 Bolivian coup d'état which overthrew the government of President Victor Paz Estenssoro. During his three-year rule, Barrientos and the army suppressed leftist opposition to his regime, including a guerrilla group led by Che Guevara in 1967.

Early years 
Barrientos was a native of Tarata, department of Cochabamba. His father was of Spanish ancestry while his mother was Quechua. After his father died when he was a child, Barrientos was sent to a Franciscan orphanage. He left the orphanage at 12 and attended a private high school while working odd jobs to pay the tuition. After graduating, he entered the military academy in La Paz. He was a career military officer, graduating from the military academy in 1943 and earning his pilot's license in 1945. Later in the 1940s, he gravitated toward the reformist Revolutionary Nationalist Movement (Movimiento Nacionalista Revolucionario, or MNR) party of Víctor Paz Estenssoro. Barrientos played a part in the Bolivian National Revolution of 1952, when the MNR toppled the established order and took power. In fact, he was given the honor of flying out of the country to bring back the revolutionary leader Víctor Paz Estenssoro, then in exile, once the rebellion succeeded. In 1957, Barrientos was rewarded when he was named commander of the Bolivian Air Force.

A new kind of general 
Known as a rather obsequious, sycophantic supporter of the MNR, he slowly became famous throughout the country for his uncommon, and very public, feats of valor. In 1960, for example, a live parachute jump demonstration by Bolivian Air Force soldiers ended in disaster when their equipment failed and 3 of the 15 parachutists fell to their death before a large crowd assembled to view the event. Recriminations flew as to who should be held responsible for the carnage. Barrientos, as Air Force commander, decided to put on a demonstration of his own, and jumped from an airplane himself using one of the parachutes that had failed to open during the earlier debacle. His point was that there had been nothing wrong with the equipment or the training, simply bad luck; this incident cemented his popularity among certain sections of the population. Furthermore, the ruling MNR helped prop up his standing, as the MNR leadership constantly extolled General Barrientos' virtues, portraying him as a paragon of the new kind of military officer the revolution had fostered.

By the early 1960s, while the ruling MNR party had begun to fall apart due to personal and policy differences between its leading members, Barrientos' stock was clearly on the rise. In addition, President Paz Estenssoro (elected to a second term in 1960) was leaning more heavily on military support to restore order to various parts of the country where rival pro-MNR militias had turned against each other, often on behalf of specific MNR leaders. Disarming the militias (who had been allowed to keep their weapons since the 1952 Revolution) became a priority to Paz, and this enhanced the role the new armed forces played in the national arena. The most popular of these military leaders was, of course, the dashing Barrientos.

Rise to power 
In 1961, Paz Estenssoro had the Bolivian Constitution amended in order to be allowed to run for consecutive re-election, feeling that only he had the standing to keep the crumbling MNR together. Traditionally, attempts such as these (known as "prorroguismo") have been strongly condemned by the Bolivian political elites, many of whose members may have been waiting for their turn to occupy the Presidential palace for years. This was no exception, and Paz's controversial move would soon prove harmful to him. Paz, surprisingly to some, chose General Barrientos as his running mate in that year's elections, and the two were sworn in on 6 August 1964. Just three months later, Barrientos — in tandem with the Army Commander Alfredo Ovando — toppled Paz in a violent coup d'état and installed himself as co-president in a Junta alongside General Ovando.

His idea all along was to capitalize on his popularity and run for elections, with the full support of the Bolivian military establishment now in control of the country. To this end, he resigned his co-presidency in early 1966 and registered himself as a candidate for president in the general elections that were held in July 1966. With the most important civilian leaders (Paz, Hernán Siles and Juan Lechín) in exile, Barrientos was easily elected, and was sworn in during August 1966.

Barrientos as constitutional president 

General Barrientos was quite charismatic, and was throughout his presidency popular with ordinary Bolivians, aided by the fluency with which he spoke Quechua, the most important native language among the Bolivian peasantry.

Barrientos was skilled at manipulating the masses with his oratory, which often allowed him to present himself as both a populist and conservative, a revolutionary and a "law-and-order" advocate. Purporting to be a staunch Christian, Barrientos actively courted the church, and in fact, chose as his running mate in the 1966 elections the leader of the small Christian Democrat Party of Bolivia, Dr. Luis Adolfo Siles. He was fiercely anti-communist and pro-free market. Accepting more military aid and acquiescing to the training of special forces designed to combat possible communist-inspired insurgencies (under the aegis of the Alliance for Progress) made Barrientos particularly popular with Washington.

The 1967 guerrilla insurgency

Barrientos had ample opportunity to prove his anti-Communist credentials in 1967, when a guerrilla force was discovered to be operating in the Bolivian southeast under the leadership of the Argentine-Cuban revolutionary Ernesto "Che" Guevara in the Bolivian jungle. Barrientos was very concerned with Guevara's alleged popularity among the miners in the southwestern part of the country, and clamped down in the area with some very heavy-handed measures (such as the San Juan massacre). Guevara felt that such an atrocity by the Bolivian Army and Air Force would be the tipping point in his favour in rallying the miners to his communist cause, but eventually the miners signed an agreement with the government-owned mining company Siglo XX, which agreement Guevara felt undermined his reason for being there. The war between the national forces under President Barrientos and Che Guevara's militia did not end there, but eventually the Bolivian Army Rangers captured Guevara and executed him in October 1967. Barrientos had directly ordered Guevara's execution after his capture.

Political troubles and Barrientos' death

While temporarily enhancing the president's stature, this only started more troubles for Barrientos. While the army was fighting the guerrillas, the miners of Siglo XX (a state-owned Bolivian mining town) declared themselves in support of the insurgency, prompting the president to send troops to regain control. This led to the San Juan massacre, when soldiers opened fire on the miners and killed around 30 men and women on Saint John's Day, called Día de San Juan in Spanish, 24 June 1967. Further, a major scandal erupted in 1968 when Barrientos' trusted friend and Minister of Interior, Antonio Arguedas, disappeared with the captured diary of Che Guevara, which soon surfaced in, of all places, Havana. From abroad, Arguedas confessed himself to have been a clandestine Marxist supporter, denouncing Barrientos and many of his aides as being on the CIA's payroll. The episode embarrassed the administration and cast doubts about the president's judgment (after all, it was he who was friends with, and had appointed, Arguedas to the most important ministry post in the government).

In the aftermath of the mining massacres and anti-guerrilla campaign, Barrientos was seen by some as a brutal dictator at the service of foreign interests while masquerading as a democrat. Eager to do some damage control and repair his once-excellent relations with the campesinos, Bolivian farm workers, the president took to traveling throughout the country to present his position, even to the smallest and remotest of Bolivian villages. It was a tactic that had yielded him good results in the past and Barrientos hoped to rebuild his political capital. However, on 27 April 1969, when flying into Arque Municipality, Cochabamba Department, he was killed in a helicopter crash. An assassination has been considered a possibility but never proven.

Notes

References

Mesa José de; Gisbert, Teresa; and Carlos D. Mesa, "Historia De Bolivia," 5th edition.
Prado Salmon, Gral. Gary. "Poder y Fuerzas Armadas, 1949-1982."

1919 births
1969 deaths
20th-century Bolivian politicians
Bolivian aviators
Bolivian generals
Bolivian anti-communists
Bolivian people of Quechua descent
Bolivian people of Spanish descent
Che Guevara
Leaders who took power by coup
Military College of the Army alumni
People from Esteban Arce Province
Politicians of Quechua descent
Presidents of Bolivia
State leaders killed in aviation accidents or incidents
Vice presidents of Bolivia
Victims of aviation accidents or incidents in Bolivia
Victims of aviation accidents or incidents in 1969
Victims of helicopter accidents or incidents